Hou Yu (born 31 January 2001) is a Chinese footballer currently playing as a defender for Guangzhou.

Career statistics

Club
.

References

2001 births
Living people
Chinese footballers
China youth international footballers
Association football defenders
China League Two players
Chinese Super League players
Guangzhou F.C. players